Anjir Siah-e Olya (also Romanized as Anjīr Sīāḩ-e ‘Olyā; also known as Anjīr-e Sīāḩ, Anjīr-e Sīāh, Anjīr-e Sīyāḩ, and Anjīr Sīāḩ) is a village in Saghder Rural District, Jebalbarez District, Jiroft County, Kerman Province, Iran. At the 2006 census, its population was 20, in 7 families.

References 

Populated places in Jiroft County